Morgan Jones (3 May 1885 – 23 April 1939) was a Welsh Labour Party politician.

Jones was born in Gelligaer to a collier and a domestic servant, and he attended primary schools in Gelligaer and Hengoed before studying at Lewis School, Pengam on a scholarship. He then attended University College, Reading, and became a teacher by profession, serving as president of the Glamorgan Federation of Teachers from 1913 to 1915. He also became a Baptist lay preacher. Jones joined the Independent Labour Party in 1908 and was elected to Gelligaer Urban District Council in 1911, serving as chairman of the council in 1921–22.

In the First World War he was imprisoned as a conscientious objector. He was also a member of the No Conscription Fellowship's national committee and chairman of the South Wales Anti-Conscription Council. After the War he was elected to Glamorgan County Council.

Morgan Jones was elected Member of Parliament (MP) for Caerphilly at a by-election in 1921, following the death of Labour MP Alfred Onions. He clinched the Labour nomination despite not being the preferred candidate of the South Wales Miners' Federation. He was the first conscientious objector to be elected to Parliament after World War I. Jones held the seat until his own death, aged 53, in 1939, when his successor was fellow conscientious objector Ness Edwards.

He served as Parliamentary Secretary to the Board of Education in both the first two Labour Governments, 1924 and 1929–1931.

Jones married Gladys Thomas, also a teacher and ILP member, in 1923. The couple had two daughters.

Morgan Jones Park in Caerphilly is named after him.

References
 

1880s births
1939 deaths
Independent Labour Party National Administrative Committee members
People from Gelligaer
Welsh Labour Party MPs
UK MPs 1918–1922
UK MPs 1922–1923
UK MPs 1923–1924
UK MPs 1924–1929
UK MPs 1929–1931
UK MPs 1931–1935
UK MPs 1935–1945
British conscientious objectors
Welsh conscientious objectors
People educated at Lewis School, Pengam
Alumni of the University of Reading
Welsh schoolteachers